Come 2 My House is the ninth studio album  by American R&B/funk singer Chaka Khan released on the NPG Records label in 1998.

Come 2 My House was Khan's first full-length album since 1992's The Woman I Am, due to the Warner Bros. Records label postponing and eventually cancelling the release of her tenth album Dare You to Love Me (1995).

Overview 
The album included two single releases; "Spoon" and "Don't Talk 2 Strangers" - neither of which charted. The album however made a brief appearance on Billboard'''s R&B Albums chart, peaking at #49.

After first covering Prince's 1979 ballad "I Feel for You" on her 1984 album of the same name and turning it into a sample-heavy hip-hop anthem and a million-selling hit single, then recording his "Sticky Wicked" (produced by Prince himself) and "Eternity" on her 1988 album CK, followed by the recording of the track "Pain" with Prince for the Dare You to Love Me album in 1995 and earlier in 1998 appearing with both Prince and legendary bassist and composer Larry Graham (Sly & The Family Stone, Graham Central Station) to promote each of their CD's on the independent NPG label, Khan and Prince finally teamed up for their first full-length project together; Come 2 My House.

While Prince co-produced all tracks but one and also helped write ten of the songs, even two of them solo, the set was very much a team effort. As Khan pointed out in the liner notes, Come 2 My House was a different album for her because it was the first time that she was not only the producer but had also composed or co-written the majority of the songs on one of her albums. During most of her career she had with a few exceptions on select albums recorded either songs written especially for her or cover versions. On Come 2 My House no less than ten out of thirteen tracks were new compositions penned by herself, either with Prince or Larry Graham, other longtime collaborators like vocalists Mark Stevens and Sandra St. Victor, Robert D. Palmer, Howard McCrary or The New Power Generation member Kirk Johnson. Two of the songs were however cover versions; Prince's "Don't Talk 2 Strangers" from 1996's Girl 6 soundtrack and Graham Central Station's classic hit "Hair" from their eponymous 1974 album.

Among the musicians contributing were several members of The New Power Generation, such as vocalist Marva King, keyboardist Kirk Johnson, bassist Rhonda Smith, drummer/percussionist Michael Bland, the horn section Hornheadz (previously known as the NPG Hornz) as well as Prince's former wife Mayte Garcia. Rapper Queen Latifah made a special guest appearance on "Pop My Clutch".

 Critical reception 

Despite receiving glowing reviews and wide variety - the album's funk, smooth ballads, gospel, hip-hop and bass-heavy beats were combined with Khan's lyrics, which were both seductive,(title track), spiritual, political ("Democrazy"), autobiographical ("This Crazy Life Of Mine"), provocative and humorous (I'll never open my legs again/to a man who's insecure, from "Never B Another Fool") - the Come 2 My House'' project was met with general indifference by musical audiences and is often regarded as Khan's second lost album.

As of 2005 it has sold 76,000 copies in United States according to Nielsen SoundScan.

Track listing 
 "Come 2 My House" (Khan, Prince, Howard McCrary, Robert D. Palmer) - 4:46 
 "This Crazy Life of Mine" (Khan, Prince) - 2:33 
 "Betcha I" (Khan, Prince, Mark Stevens) - 4:30 
 "Spoon" (Khan, Howard McCrary, Robert D. Palmer) - 3:50 
 "Pop My Clutch" (Kirk Johnson, Khan, Prince) - 4:47 
 "Journey 2 the Center of Your Heart" (Prince) - 4:16 
 "I'll Never B Another Fool" (Khan, Prince, Sandra St. Victor) - 4:13 
 "Democrazy" (Khan, Prince) - 6:08 
 "I Remember U" (Larry Graham, Khan, Prince) - 4:16 
 "Reconsider (U Betta)" (Khan, Prince) - 4:23 
 "Don't Talk 2 Strangers" (Prince) - 3:16 
 "Hair" (Larry Graham) - 5:45 
 "The Drama" (Kirk Johnson, Khan) - 6:36

Personnel 
 Chaka Khan - vocals
 Robert D. Palmer - vocals
 Kirk Johnson - vocals
 Queen Latifah - rap vocals
 Prince - guitar, background vocals
 Mike Scott - acoustic guitar
 Kathy Jensen - saxophone
 Walter Chancellor, Jr. - saxophone
 The Hornheadz - horns
 David (Dave) Jensen - trumpet
 Ricky Peterson - keyboards
 Larry Graham - bass guitar, background vocals
 Rhonda Smith - bass
 Michael Bland - drums
 Mayte Garcia - finger cymbals
 Brother Jules - scratches
 Chanté Moore - background vocals

Production 
 Chaka Khan - record producer tracks 1-14
 Prince - record producer tracks: 1-4, 6-14
 Howard McCrary - producer track: 5
 Robert D. Palmer - producer track: 5
 Ricky Peterson - additional production track: 3, 9, 11

References 

1998 albums
Chaka Khan albums
Albums produced by Prince (musician)
NPG Records albums